Roland Toutain (October 18, 1905 - October 16, 1977) was a French actor, songwriter and stuntman. He appeared in 55 films between 1924 and 1957, both in leading and supporting roles.

Life and career 
Toutain is known for playing the aviator André Jurieux in Jean Renoir's film The Rules of the Game (La Règle du jeu). The role suited him: Toutain was also an avid hobby aviator, as well as an acrobat. He first gained fame as an actor in the adventure film  and its sequel . Toutain also appeared in Fritz Lang's Liliom (1934). His film career slowed down in the late 1940s and he made his final movie in 1956. He was a good friend of fellow actor Jean Marais, who organized his funeral.

Selected filmography
 L'Inhumaine (1924)
 The Mystery of the Yellow Room (1930)
 The Perfume of the Lady in Black (1931)
 Liliom (1934)
 Miquette (1934)
 Veille d'armes (1935)
 Jenny (1936)
 Yoshiwara (1937)
 The Lie of Nina Petrovna (1937)
 Barnabé (1938)
 Three from St Cyr (1939)
 The Rules of the Game (1939)
 The Mysteries of Paris (1943)
 Captain Fracasse (1943)
 We Are Not Married (1946)
 Dakota 308 (1951)
  (1957)

See also 
 L'Éternel retour

Notes

External links
 
 

1905 births
1977 deaths
French male film actors
20th-century French male actors